Pidbirtsi is a village in Lviv Raion of Lviv Oblast in Ukraine.

Pidbirtsi was previously located in Pustomyty Raion until it was abolished on 18 July 2020 as part of the administrative reform of Ukraine, which reduced the number of raions of Zhytomyr Oblast to four. The area of Pustomyty Raion was merged into Lviv Raion.

References

Villages in Lviv Raion